is a multi-part science fiction/fantasy literary series by Ryō Hanmura. It was published in 7 volumes from 1975–1995. The series is generally regarded as a classic in the world of Japanese science fiction. In SF Magazine, it was voted as one of the top ten Japanese science fiction novels of all time alongside Hanmura's other masterpiece . A manga with the same name, following a similar plot, was drawn by Leiji Matsumoto.

Overview
The narrative concerns the exploits of the Dark Emperor Gido, the alien leader of a demonic anti-Shinto faith known as "Kido". Desiring to conquer the earth, he sends forth several disembodied alien entities to possess human hosts in 17th century Japan.

Books

References

Historical fantasy novels
Japanese fantasy novels
Japanese historical novels
1975 novels